Ett liv med dig is a 2007 album by Swedish band the Drifters. The album peaked at 31st position at the Swedish album chart.

On the album, songs are written by songwriters like Thomas G:son, Calle Kindbom, Anders Glenmark, Calle Lösnitz, Ulf Georgsson and Lasse Holm. The song "Love is in Your Eyes" is performed by the band's main vocalist Erika Sjöström as a duet with Casper Janebrink from Arvingarna. The album also consists of recordings of songs like "Ännu en dag", performed by Anne-Lie Rydé, at Melodifestivalen 2005, as well as the Ann-Louise Hanson song "Don't Slam the Door".

Track listing

Charts

References

External links
Album cover (the album is dated 2007, and not 1997 as the website states) 

2007 albums
Drifters (Swedish band) albums
Swedish-language albums